Sayed Jamaluddin Mosque is a former mosque and archaeological site located in the ancient city of Saptagram in Hooghly district, West Bengal. The mosque was built during the reign of the Bengali sultan Nasiruddin Nasrat Shah.

History
A stone foundation plaque attached to the mosque states that it was constructed by Sayed Jamaluddin, son of Sayed Fakhruddin of Amol during the reign of Nasiruddin Nasrat Shah. The date mentioned in the inscription is Ramadan 936 AH which corresponds to May 1529. Within the mosque complex are three tombs, which belong to Sayed Fakhruddin, his wife and his eunuch.

Architecture
It is a unique brick built mosque decorated with terracotta ornamentation. It represents the terracotta elements of the Islamic architecture of Bengal.  There are three tombs in the mosque complex. At present the ruined mosque is under the maintenance of Archaeological Survey of India (ASI).

Gallery

References

Buildings and structures in Hooghly district
Mosques in West Bengal
Mosques completed in 1529
Archaeological sites in West Bengal
Former mosques in India
Tourist attractions in Hooghly district
Bengal Sultanate mosques
Hussain Shahi dynasty